Oxnard Air Force Base is a former United States Air Force base, located in the city of Camarillo, California.

History
Camarillo Airport was originally established in 1942 when the California State Highway Department constructed an auxiliary landing field with a  runway. During World War II the 36th Flying Training Wing (U.S. Army Air Forces) supervised contractors training pilots at the airfield. In the 1950s, the base was also home to the 354th Fighter Interceptor Squadron. In Mid-1960s the base received 17 new F-106 Delta Darts. On January 1, 1970, Oxnard AFB was deactivated and the base became surplus property. Oxnard had 99 Officers and 990 enlisted assigned prior to its closing. The last commanding officer of the 414th Fighter Group was Colonel Paul D. Cofer.

References

Installations of the United States Air Force in California
Ventura County, California
Military installations closed in 1970
Camarillo, California